Contheyla is a genus of moths in the family Limacodidae.

Species
Contheyla brunnea  Swinhoe, 1904
Contheyla lola  Swinhoe, 1904
Contheyla vestita Walker, 1865

References

 ftp.funet.fi

Limacodidae genera
Limacodidae